Cryptolestes uncicornis is a species of lined flat bark beetle in the family Laemophloeidae. It is found in the Caribbean Sea, Central America, North America, and South America.

References

Further reading

External links

 

Laemophloeidae
Articles created by Qbugbot
Beetles described in 1874